Eutreta margaritata is a species of tephritid or fruit flies in the genus Eutreta of the family Tephritidae.

Distribution
Mexico.

References

Tephritinae
Insects described in 1914
Diptera of North America